The Moravamminacea is a superfamily of foraminifera within Fusulinida that comprises genera in which the proloculus (initial chamber) is followed by a coiled or straight second chamber, and in which periods of growth result in partial or incipient septa.  Contains three families, Caligellidae, Moravamminidae, and Paratickenellidae, with an overall range from the upper Silurian to the Lower Carboniferous (Mississippian).

In older classifications (e.g. Loeblich and Tappan 1964) these were the Moravaminninae, a subfamily within the Parathuraminacea, as then defined.

References

Alfred R. Loeblich Jr and Helen Tappan, 1964. Sarcodina Chiefly "Thecamoebians" and Foraminiferida; Treatise on Invertebrate Paleontology, part C Protista 2. Geological Society of America and University of Kansas Press. R.C. Moore (ed)
Alfred R. Loeblich Jr and Helen Tappan,1988. Forminiferal Genera and their Classification. Van Nostrand Reinhold.

Foraminifera superfamilies